V. Yuvaraj (b 1964; d 2022) is an Indian politician from Tamil Nadu who belongs to Desiya Murpokku Dravida Kazhagam- DMDK. He contested 2009 Lok Sabha elections from Chennei North.

He contested 2014 Lok Sabha elections from Thiruvallur (Lok Sabha constituency) as DMDK / NDA candidate.

References 

Desiya Murpokku Dravida Kazhagam politicians
National Democratic Alliance candidates in the 2014 Indian general election
1964 births
Living people
Place of birth missing (living people)